The Merrill-Palmer Quarterly is a quarterly peer-reviewed scientific journal covering developmental psychology. It was established in 1954 and is published by Wayne State University Press. From 1958 to 1981, it was known as the Merrill-Palmer Quarterly of Behavior and Development. The editor-in-chief is Gary W. Ladd (Arizona State University). According to the Journal Citation Reports, the journal has a 2017 impact factor of 1.231.

References

External links

Developmental psychology journals
Quarterly journals
Publications established in 1954
Wayne State University
English-language journals
Academic journals published by university presses of the United States